{{DISPLAYTITLE:C3H3N3O3}}
The molecular formula C3H3N3O3 (molar mass: 129.08 g/mol, exact mass: 129.0174 u) may refer to:

 Cyanuric acid
 Cyamelide